Castle Rock is a mountain in Denali Borough in Alaska in the United States.

Castle Rock is located at 63.366389° North Latitude 150.274444° West Longitude, 26.4 statute miles (42.5 kilometers) from Healy, Alaska.

References
Trails.com Castle Rock USGS Stepovak Bay Quad, Alaska, Topographic Map
MountainZone.com Castle Rock Summit - Alaska Mountain Peak Information

Mountains of Denali Borough, Alaska
Mountains of Alaska